The 1984 Missouri gubernatorial election was held on November 6, 1984 and resulted in a victory for the Republican nominee, Missouri Attorney General John Ashcroft, over the Democratic candidate, Lt. Governor Ken Rothman, and Independent Bob Allen.

Incidentally, both Bond and Ashcroft would later serve in the United States Senate from 1995 until 2001.

Republican primary

Candidates
John Ashcroft, Attorney General of Missouri
Paul Binggeli
Gene McNary, St. Louis County Executive and nominee for U.S. Senate in 1980

Results

Democratic primary

Candidates
Bob Buck
Mel Carnahan, State Treasurer
Norman L. Merrell, State Senator from Monticello
Don Pine
Lavoy Reed
Ken Rothman, Lieutenant Governor and former Speaker of the Missouri House
Roy Smith

Results

General election

Results

References

Gubernatorial
1984
Missouri